Cesare Milani (4 January 1905 – 21 June 1956) was an Italian rowing coxswain who competed in the 1928 Summer Olympics, in the 1932 Summer Olympics, and in the 1936 Summer Olympics.

In 1928 he coxed the Italian boat which was eliminated in the quarter-finals of the coxed pair event. Four years later he won the silver medal as coxswain of the Italian boat in the men's eight competition. In 1936 he won his second silver medal as the coxswain of the Italian boat in the men's eight event.

References

External links
 profile

1905 births
1956 deaths
Italian male rowers
Olympic rowers of Italy
Coxswains (rowing)
Rowers at the 1928 Summer Olympics
Rowers at the 1932 Summer Olympics
Rowers at the 1936 Summer Olympics
Olympic silver medalists for Italy
Olympic medalists in rowing
Medalists at the 1936 Summer Olympics
Medalists at the 1932 Summer Olympics
European Rowing Championships medalists